The Bodyguard World Tour is the fifth concert tour by American recording artist, Whitney Houston. The tour was in support of her multi-platinum soundtrack album, The Bodyguard, and also of the movie of the same name. Following the success of the album and worldwide hit singles "I Will Always Love You", "I Have Nothing" and "I'm Every Woman", Houston started the extensive world tour that lasted through the fall of 1994.

Background
With the enormous success of the movie and its soundtrack, Houston went on an extensive world tour to support her projects. Houston began rehearsals two months after giving birth to daughter, Bobbi Kristina Brown. The opening date was in Miami on July 5, 1993. Houston received a lot of flak for showing up late and then telling a fan who wanted an autograph to sit down. Houston played five nights at Radio City Music Hall in New York City, and then played six nights at the Sands Hotel & Casino in Atlantic City.

Most of the shows during this 1993 US leg were in theaters because Houston wanted an intimate setting. During the US leg, Houston took a break to fly over to Europe to accompany husband Bobby Brown on his tour. Gospel act Angie & Debbie Winans were the opening act for the 1993 US leg. During the second North American leg in 1994, Houston performed at the opening ceremony of the 1994 FIFA World Cup at the Rose Bowl Stadium.

During that time, the singer had throat ailments and had to cancel eight shows during that time, all of which were rescheduled a month later. Houston also went public concerning having a miscarriage during the tour. The tour was a big success. Many shows were among the highest grossing shows of their week. The grossings helped Houston make Forbes magazine's Richest Entertainers list. Houston earned over $33 million during 1993 and 1994, the third highest for a female entertainer.

Critical reception
During her first Radio City Music Hall performance in New York City, Stephen Holden of the New York Times wrote that "her stylistic trademarks -- shivery melismas that ripple up in the middle of a song, twirling embellishments at the ends of phrases that suggest an almost breathless exhilaration -- infuse her interpretations with flashes of musical and emotional lightning." At one of her Atlantic City dates, Kevin L. Carter of the Philadelphia Inquirer wrote that Houston handled her songs "with subdued emotionalism and the intelligence that only a gifted musician can bring to a song.

"Saving All My Love for You" was turned into a "smoky saloon-style ballad". Many critics noted that the highlight of the show was when Houston took on "And I Am Telling You" from Dreamgirls, and "I Loves You Porgy" from Porgy and Bess. Stephen Holden wrote of the medley that "her voice conveyed authority, power, determination and just enough vulnerability to give a sense of dramatic intention". As always, Houston included gospel songs. She introduced her band while performing 'Revelation.' Houston spoke about the Lord before going into 'Jesus Loves Me' which was often accompanied with complete silence from the mesmerized crowd." During the last couple of years, since her marriage to Brown, the tabloids generated many stories about Houston and Brown. The New York Post created a rumor that the singer had overdosed on diet pills, leading to a lawsuit filed by Houston. During her shows, while performing her love medley, Houston often denied tabloid rumors. Houston often brought her husband and baby to the stage with her to prove that they are a happy family and that the tabloids are wrong.

Many critics felt that these tabloid stories helped her sing with more conviction and emotion. According to some critics, Brown's presence made "All the Man That I Need" a more stirring performance leading up the emotional high of "I Have Nothing", while others felt they were unnecessary, cheesy moments. Many critics praised her Aretha Franklin medley that she performed at certain shows. Houston performed "Ain't No Way", "(You Make Me Feel Like A) Natural Woman" and "Do Right Woman, Do Right Man". According to Jon Beam of the Minneapolis Star Tribune, the Aretha Franklin medley was a triumph of substance over style. He wrote that "She seemed a natural instead of a studied singer doing "A Natural Woman", and "Do Right Woman" was a right-on, soulful country-blues song, with a traditional call-and-response between Houston and her backup singers."

Houston's performance at the Pond in Anaheim, Chris William of the Los Angeles Times wrote that, "she approached sheer vocal perfection at virtually every turn". And noted that, "she got to apply that astonishing instrument to some material worthy of it. Watching her progress emotionally through a gospel standard or great ‘60s R&B; ballad made it all the more difficult to see Houston go back and end the show as she began it"
Houston returned a year later at Radio City Music Hall, opening a seven-night sold-out engagement in September 1994. Jon Pareles of the New York Times reports, "Houston belted ballads, predictably bringing down the house with songs that moved from aching verses to surging choruses. A medley of hits from Dionne Warwick, Ms. Houston's cousin, lacked Ms. Warwick's lightness, but Ms. Houston made "Alfie" sound like the ethical wrangle it is". Ira Robbins of Newsday wrote, "Houston peaked in the Warwick segment with marvelous adaptions of "I Say a Little Prayer" and "Alfie", and "after the powerful one-two of "I Have Nothing" and a rendition of "Run to You" so compelling it would have been no shock to see Kevin Costner jog out".

Opening acts
Smoothe Sylk (North America—Leg 3)
Angie & Debbie (Miami, Vienna, Mansfield, New York City, Los Angeles, Cerritos)
Jay Johnson (Atlantic City—July 1993)
E.Y.C. (Heerenveen, Maastricht)

Setlist

Notes
On select dates, from July 1993 to September 1994, Houston closed the show with a duet of "Something in Common" with Bobby Brown.
In North America and Europe, "My Name Is Not Susan" was performed on select dates. "You Give Good Love" was performed on select dates in Europe.
During the show on July 30, 1993 in Atlantic City, Houston performed "Stormy Weather" as a tribute to Lena Horne.
On November 5 and 7, 1993, August 14, September 16, 27 and 28, 1994: Houston performed "Run to You" followed by "I Have Nothing".
During the concerts in Brazil, Houston brought Bobby Brown onstage and sang "(You Make Me Feel Like) A Natural Woman" to him.
The New York City concerts in September 1994, Houston performed a medley of Walk On By", "A House Is Not a Home" and "Alfie", also select dates included a performance of "I'm Your Baby Tonight". On September 16, Houston closed the show with "Greatest Love of All".
The final show on September 30, 1994 in North America, Houston performed "You Are So Beautiful", "For the Love of You", "Amazing Grace" and closed the show with "I Will Always Love You".
Houston altered her South Africa set specifically for the HBO televised show in Johannesburg on November 12, removing "Nobody Loves Me Like You Do" and "Where Do Broken Hearts Go". During the show in Cape Town on November 19, 1994, Houston performed "All the Man That I Need" and "Wonderful Counselor".

Shows

Festivals and other miscellaneous performances
Summer Pops Series
Hollywood Rock

Cancellations and rescheduled shows 

1.:Figures reported for the concerts held in New York City, July 1993.

Notes

Touring Personnel
Band:
 Musical Director, Bass Guitar/Synth Bass – Rickey Minor
 Guitar – Carlos Rios
 Keyboards – Bette Sussman
 Keyboards – Wayne Linsey
 Saxophone/EWI – Kirk Whalum
 Percussion – Bashiri Johnson
 Drums – Michael Baker
Background Vocalists:
 Gary Houston
 Olivia McClurkin
 Pattie Howard
 Josie James
Tour Management:
 Tour Manager – Tony Bulluck
 Tour Accountant – Wade Perry
 Production Manager – Vernon Wilson
 Stage Manager – Dewan Mitchell
 Set/Lighting Designer – Andy Elias
Crew:
 Front of House Sound Engineer – George Strakis
 Monitor Engineer – Alan Vachon
 Lighting Director – Charlie Unkeless
 Lighting Crew Chief – Roy Jennings 
 Vari*Lite Programmer/Operator – Tom Celner 

Source:

Broadcasting and recordings
 Houston's November 12, date in Johannesburg, South Africa, was broadcast live on HBO Cable TV, Whitney: The Concert for a New South Africa. The special was later released on home video. There are also televised recordings of her concerts in Argentina, Brazil, and Chile.
 The concerts in Chile, Argentina, Brazil and Venezuela were televised in select countries in South America.

External links
 the bodyguard tour - whitneyhouston

References

Whitney Houston concert tours
1993 concert tours
1994 concert tours